The 1979 Stanley Cup Finals was the championship series of the National Hockey League's (NHL) 1978–79 season, and the culmination of the 1979 Stanley Cup playoffs. The New York Rangers challenged the defending champion Montreal Canadiens, who made their fourth straight appearance. It was New York's first foray into the Finals since . The Canadiens would win the best-of-seven series, four games to one, to win their fourth consecutive Stanley Cup championship.

This was the last Stanley Cup Final until 2013 where both teams were from the Original Six, and the first of six consecutive Finals involving a team from the New York metropolitan area. The next five Finals would be contested by the Rangers' crosstown rivals the New York Islanders, who would win the first four of those series to forge a dynasty matching that of the Canadiens. By defeating the Rangers, the Canadiens completed the rare accomplishment of winning four consecutive titles in a North American league competition consisting of at least sixteen teams, and remain the only team based outside the New York metropolitan area to do so. Prior to the Canadiens' dynasty, the feat had been achieved only twice before, both times by the New York Yankees in Major League Baseball. The aforementioned Islanders are the only team to accomplish it since.

Paths to the Finals

Montreal defeated the Toronto Maple Leafs 4–0 and the Boston Bruins 4–3 (highlighted by the "too many men on the ice" game seven overtime win) to advance to the Final.

New York defeated the Los Angeles Kings 2–0, the Philadelphia Flyers 4–1 and the New York Islanders 4–2 to make it to the finals.

Game summaries
The Canadiens won the Cup in five games, winning it on home ice for the first time since . After the game Jacques Lemaire, Yvan Cournoyer and Ken Dryden retired, while head coach Scotty Bowman would leave the Canadiens to join the Buffalo Sabres, which would mark the end of the Canadiens' dynasty. Montreal Canadiens scored 46 total points during the Stanley Cup finals, while the New York Rangers scored 26 points in the finals.

This Final marked the second time in four years that Bowman and Fred Shero coached against each other. In , they coached against each other, though Shero was with the Philadelphia Flyers.

Team rosters

Montreal Canadiens

|}

New York Rangers

|}

Stanley Cup engraving
The 1979 Stanley Cup was presented to Canadiens acting captain Serge Savard by NHL President John Ziegler following the Canadiens 4–1 win over the Rangers in game five.

The following Canadiens players and staff had their names engraved on the Stanley Cup

1978–79 Montreal Canadiens

Members of Montreal Canadiens 1976 to 1979 dynasty 
Players: Rick Chartraw, Yvan Cournoyer, Ken Dryden, Bob Gainey, Doug Jarvis, Guy Lafleur, Yvon Lambert, Guy Lapointe, Michel Larocque, Jacques Lemaire, Doug Risebrough, Larry Robinson, Serge Savard, Steve Shutt, Mario Tremblay 
Non players: Jacques Courtois, Sam Pollock, Jean Beliveau, Scotty Bowman, Claude Ruel, Eddie Palchak, Pierre Meilleur, Ron Caron, Floyd Curry

Broadcasting
The Stanley Cup Finals were produced by CBC, who carried the game in Canada and were shown in the United States on the NHL's syndicated package. Dan Kelly called the play-by-play for Games 1, 3, 4, and 5 entirely. Danny Gallivan and Kelly split play-by-play for Game 2 only. Gary Dornhoefer served as color commentator for Games 1 and 5, Gerry Pinder served as color commentator for Game 2 only, Bobby Orr served as color commentator from Madison Square Garden. Meanwhile, Dick Irvin Jr. served as color commentator for the entire Finals. He also served as studio host in Montreal, Dave Hodge in New York City, and Howie Meeker served as studio analyst. ABC was contracted to televise game seven. Since the Finals ended in five games, the contract was void.

See also
 1978–79 NHL season

References

Bibliography
 
 

Stanley Cup
Stanley Cup Finals
Montreal Canadiens games
New York Rangers games
Finals
Ice hockey competitions in Montreal
1970s in Montreal
Stanley Cup Finals
Ice hockey competitions in New York City
Stanley Cup Finals
Stanley Cup Finals
Stanley Cup Finals
1970s in Manhattan
Madison Square Garden